Guy Delcourt may refer to:
Guy Delcourt (editor) (born 1958), French publisher
Guy Delcourt (politician) (1947–2020), French politician